Air raid may refer to:

Attacks
 Airstrike
 Strategic bombing

Other uses
Air Raid (album), by the improvisational collective Air
Air Raid (Transformers), the name of three characters in the Transformers universes
Air Raid (video game), a rare 1982 game for the Atari 2600
Air Raid (1978 video game), a 1978 video game for the TRS-80
Air Raid, a 1977 John Varley short story which provided the basis for the 1989 film Millennium
Air raid offense, a pass-oriented form of the spread offense in American football
Air raid siren, used to provide emergency population warning of approaching danger and sometimes to indicate when the danger has passed